Royal Air Force Montrose or more simply RAF Montrose is a former Royal Air Force station in Forfarshire (now more commonly called Angus) in Scotland. It became the first operational military aerodrome to be established in the United Kingdom on 26 February 1913.

History

First World War
In 1912 the British government planned twelve "Air Stations" operated by the Royal Flying Corps.  Under the instructions of the First Lord of the Admiralty Winston Churchill, the first of these was at Montrose, allowing aircraft the ability to protect the Royal Navy bases at Rosyth, Cromarty and Scapa Flow.

On 13 February 1913 five aircraft of No. 2 Squadron of the Royal Flying Corps took off from RAF Farnborough under the command of Major C J Burke. The  journey north was completed in a series of stages over the following 13 days.

At the end of 1913 Army Engineers erected three hangars of Indian Army Shed design on the site (known as the "Major Burkes sheds"), enabling the squadron to move there at the start of 1914.

World War I started on 28 July 1914 and in August of that year No.2 squadron moved to France. The first pilot to land in France after the declaration of war was Lieutenant H.D. Harvey-Kelly of No.2 Squadron RFC. Another of the squadrons' pilots, 2nd Lt. W B Rhodes-Moorhouse, became the first pilot to be awarded the Victoria Cross.  Unfortunately it was awarded posthumously on 26 April 1915.

No.2 squadron never returned to Montrose but as the war progressed several new ones were stationed there.

Squadrons at Montrose

No. 2 Squadron RFC 26 February 1913 to August 1914
No. 6 Reserve Aeroplane Squadron RFC formed July 1915
No. 25 Squadron – 25 September 1915 from No. 6 Reserve Squadron, flying F.E.2bs on fighter and reconnaissance duties. Moved to France in February 1916
No. 80 Squadron – 1 September 1917, flying Sopwith Camel. Sent to France at the start of 1918 in a fighter role
No. 82 (Canadian) Reserve Squadron formed January 1917
No. 83 Squadron – 7 January 1917, flying the F.E.2b as a bomber, and some FE2d's.
No. 39 Reserve Squadron RFC formed 26 August 1917
No. 52 Reserve Squadron RFC September 1917
No. 36 Reserve Squadron RFC December 1917
41st Aero Squadron (Pursuit) US Army Air Service March 1918
138th Aero Squadron (Pursuit) US Army Air Service March 1918
176th Aero Squadron US Army Air Service March 1918

Other Units at Montrose

30th Wing Headquarters RAF April 1918
No.6 Training Squadron RAF April 1918
No.18 Training Squadron RAF April 1918
No.38 Training Squadron RAF April 1918
No.26 Training Depot Squadron RAF July 1918
No.32 Training Depot Squadron RAF July 1918

It became a major training airfield with Americans arriving in 1918 to train for the Western Front, and Canadian and British Squadrons forming.

Aircraft flown at Montrose

Armstrong Whitworth F.K.3 :  Avro 504 A/J/K :  Bristol F.2 B :  Bristol Scout C/D:  Caudron G.3 :  Curtiss JN-4 / JN-3 :  Airco DH.1, DH2, DH4, DH6, DH9 : Maurice Farman MF.7 Longhorn:  Maurice Farman MF.11 Shortman :  Grahame-White Type XV:  Martinsyde S.1 :  Martinsyde G.100 Elephant :  Royal Aircraft Factory B.E.2 b/c/d/e :  Royal Aircraft Factory B.E.12  /c :  Royal Aircraft Factory F.E.2b :  Royal Aircraft Factory F.E.8 :  Royal Aircraft Factory R.E.8:  Royal Aircraft Factory S.E.5 /a : Sopwith 1-1/2 Strutter :  Sopwith Camel :  Sopwith Pup :  Vickers FB9 :

Between the Wars
RAF Montrose closed in 1920.  Starting in 1924 the Major Burke's Sheds were again used, this time for the maintenance and refurbishment of Lewis machine guns.

In 1935 the British government decided to expand the RAF in the face of a growing threat from Germany and a key requirement was for more trained military pilots.  RAF Montrose, virtually unchanged from the First World War, was re-opened on 1 January 1936 as No. 8 Flying Training School. Between that date and the end of the Battle of Britain an estimated 800 pilots trained and got their 'wings' at Montrose though not all of these became fighter pilots.

Many of the British WWII Fighter Aces were trained at Montrose.

Second World War

During the Second World War, many fighter squadrons and the Fleet Air Arm served at RAF Montrose. Commonwealth, Polish, Czech, American, Russian, Turkish, Free French and other Allied nationals all trained and served at RAF Montrose during this time.

Operational duties included serving as a location for the Spitfires and Hurricanes which formed part of the air defence for the city of Edinburgh.

From August 1944 RAF Kinnell served as the stations satellite for No. 2 Fighter Interception Squadron until July 1945.  The station also flew regular missions to Norway for reconnaissance, supply drops for the Norwegian resistance movement, and entry/exit for Special Operations Executive.  On 25 October 1940 three German Junkers Ju 88 aircraft dropped 24 bombs on the station killing five, injuring 18 and destroying two hangars and the officers mess.  They and the pilots who died in local training accidents are buried in a Commonwealth War Graves Commission plot in the local church.

Famous RAF pilots and Fighter Aces who were trained or stationed at RAF Station Montrose during WWII.

Wing Commander Brendan "Paddy" Finucane DSO DFC** 
Flight Lieutenant Richard Hillary 
Flight Lieutenant Brian Carbury DFC*
Squadron Leader Basil Gerald "Stapme" Stapleton DFC
Flight Lieutenant George "Screwball" or "Buzz" Beurling DSO DFC DFM 
Wing Commander Tom "Ginger" Neil DFC* AFC AE
Wing Commander John Freeborn DFC*
Group Captain Peter Townsend CVO DSO DFC*
Wing Commander Ian Richard "Widge"  Gleed DSO DFC

Squadrons at RAF Montrose

No. 269 Squadron RAF 25 August 1939 to 10 October 1939
No. 603 (City of Edinburgh) Squadron RAF January to August 1940
No. 248 Squadron RAF May to July 1940
No. 141 Squadron RAF August 1940
No. 145 Squadron RAF August to October 1940
No. 111 Squadron RAF October 1940 to July 1941
No. 17 Squadron RAF August 1941
No. 232 Squadron RAF April to July 1941
No. 310 Squadron RAF (Czech) July to December 1941
No. 132 Squadron RAF July 1941 to February 1942

 Other Units at RAF Montrose

The following units were here at some point:
 No. 8 Service Flying Training School RAF 1 January 1936 to 25 March 1942 (No. 8 FTS)
 No. 2 Flying Instructors School RAF January 1942 to July 1945 (No. 2 FIS (Advanced))
 No. 11 Air Sea Rescue Marine Craft Unit 1944
 No. 8 Anti-Aircraft Practice Camp RAF
 No. 21 Group RAF
 No. 44 Maintenance Unit RAF
 No. 260 Maintenance Unit RAF
 No. 1632 (Anti-Aircraft Co-operation) Flight RAF
 No. 2749 Squadron RAF Regiment
 No. 2789 Squadron RAF Regiment

Aircraft flown at RAF Montrose

Airspeed Oxford Mk I : Avro Anson Mk I : Avro Tutor : Boulton Paul Defiant Mk I : Bristol Beaufighter Mk IC : Bristol Beaufort Mk IIA :  Bristol Blenheim Mk I :  de Havilland Don : de Havilland Hornet : de Havilland Moth : de Havilland Tiger Moth II : Gloster Gauntlet : Gloster Gladiator I : Hawker Fury : Hawker Hart Trainer/ Audax : Hawker Hind : Hawker Hurricane Mk I, IIA, IIB, IIc :Hawker Typhoon :  Lockheed Hudson VI : Miles Magister :  Miles Martinet TT MkI : Miles Master I/II/III :  North American Harvard IIb (T-6 Texan) : Percival Proctor P.30 II : Supermarine Spitfire Mk I, IIA, IIB, VA, VB,VC,VI, XI. : Supermarine Walrus : Westland Lysander Mk II, III, IIIA: Westland Whirlwind I : Fairey Gordon:

Postwar

During 1948 it was home to No 63 Maintenance Unit (No 63 MU) and aircraft for repair were brought in and shipped out by road as there were no tarmac runways. Activity was minimal until the crisis in Hong Kong and the onset of the Korean War when the unit became very busy.  RAF Montrose closed permanently on 4 June 1952.

Mountain Rescue
Whilst Montrose is relatively flat the area is bounded by mountains and aircraft crashes on them were not uncommon.  RAF Station Montrose (Montrose Air Station) had carried out mountain rescues on an ad hoc basis but in January 1944 the RAF formed the Royal Air Force Mountain Rescue Service.  Ten teams were put together and one of these was located here at Montrose.  In 1945 the team was moved to nearby RAF Edzell only to be moved out of the area in 1946.  In 1949 a Mountain Rescue Team (MRT) of the RAF Mountain Rescue Service was established at RAF Montrose to cover the area of the central Grampians.  This improved the emergency rescue facilities for the whole of Scotland with teams at RAF Kinloss covering the north and RAF West Freugh the west.  In 1950 it again moved back to RAF Edzell.  In 1955 they moved to RAF Leuchars and have remained there.

Accidents
During the Aerodrome's early days as a pilot training facility an American pilot wrote that there was "a crash every day and a funeral every week". The military gravestones at the local cemetery, Sleepy Hillock, bear witness to the numerous deaths of those learning to fly at Montrose.

Ghost stories
RAF Station Montrose has been described by believers as one of the most haunted places in Britain.

Lt Desmond Arthur was killed in a flying accident on 27 May 1913, his spirit is said to have haunted the officers' mess. Since then there have been many other claimed sightings of apparitions in pilots' uniforms and phantom planes. In 2010 it was claimed wartime music and speech was heard to come from a 70-year-old radio which was "not powered in any way".

Montrose Air Station Heritage Centre

In 1983 the Montrose Air Station Heritage Trust was formed, today known as the Ian McIntosh Memorial Trust.  In 1992 the trust purchased the Watch Office and ground, and created the Montrose Air Station Heritage Centre. They have since added more buildings and collections.  Several historic buildings and hangars are still located on site, and the perimeter taxi track is still largely intact.

References

Citations

Bibliography

External links

RAF Montrose/Montrose Air Museum

Royal Air Force stations in Scotland
Aerospace museums in Scotland
Air force museums in the United Kingdom
Reportedly haunted locations in Scotland
Museums in Angus, Scotland
Airports established in 1913
Museums established in 1992
1913 establishments in Scotland